Dunbier is a surname. Notable people with the surname include:

 Augustus Dunbier (1888–1977), American painter
 Max Dunbier (1938–2016), Australian politician, son of Ron
 Ron Dunbier (1914–1984), Australian politician
 Scott Dunbier, American comic book editor